D-Live!! (stylized as D-LIVE!!) is a Japanese manga series written and illustrated by Ryōji Minagawa. It was serialized in Shogakukan's Weekly Shōnen Sunday magazine from 2002 to 2006. The manga tells the story of Satoru Ikaruga, a high schooler nicknamed "genius driver" who can operate almost any vehicle and works for a multinational specialist company called the Almighty Support Enterprise (ASE). Ikaruga is called whenever ASE is hired to solve a case which involves vehicle driving, most of the time working with other ASE agents to resolve situations assigned to them by various clients.

Plot
Satoru Ikaruga is just an ordinary high school student who enjoys eating food. Unknown to most of his classmates and teachers, he is an operative of the Almighty Support Enterprise as a vehicle driving specialist. He is deployed worldwide while being supported by various ASE agents in accomplishing cases assigned to them by their clients.

Characters

A high school boy who does part-time jobs with ASE Japan Branch as a vehicle driver specialist. His father was a friend of Hajime Mozu and also an ASE driver who died in doing his job.

A high school girl, the mechanic specialist of ASE Japan Branch. Her dream is to make her late father's motorcycle racing team win the Suzuka 8 Hours endurance race. She almost made it with Satoru riding her bike, but an accident happened that made Satoru did not finish the race.

Chief of ASE Japan branch. He is an ex-ASE vehicle driver specialist, Satoru was trained by him. He is sometimes cruel to Satoru by cutting his payment if Satoru made any mistake in doing his job.

He is ASE USA branch's specialist in spying and infiltrating. He is also a playboy and thinks that he is the next James Bond. He always gets sick if traveling in a vehicle, especially if the driver is Satoru. Only Mozu can make him not sick in a vehicle.

ASE Japan Branch's specialist of geology. She is lecturer in a university in Japan.

He is ASE USA branch's specialist in detonating bomb and CQB. An ex-SWAT Team member. Joined ASE after Satoru saved him from an exploded building he was trapped.

Publication
D-Live!!, written and illustrated by Ryōji Minagawa, was serialized in Shogakukan's shōnen manga magazine Weekly Shōnen Sunday from October 16, 2002, to April 19, 2006. Shogakukan collected its chapters in fifteen tankōbon volumes, released from March 18, 2003, to August 11, 2006.

In France it was published by Editions Kabuto with five volumes published prior to its termination. In Hong Kong, Jonesky published all of its volumes in Chinese. Planet Manga published four volumes of D-Live!! in Italian prior to its termination. It is published in South Korea by Samyang Comics. Tong Li published the manga in Taiwan.

Reception
D-Live!! had been selected among the most recommended manga to read at the 9th Japan Media Arts Festival in 2005.

References

External links

2002 manga
Adventure anime and manga
Ryōji Minagawa
Shogakukan manga
Shōnen manga